Eric Masterson may refer to:
Thunderstrike (Eric Masterson), a comic book superhero in the Marvel universe
Eric Masterson (actor) (born 1970), adult film actor